The Marpod is a left tributary of the river Hârtibaciu in Romania. It flows into the Hârtibaciu near the village Marpod.

References

Rivers of Romania
Rivers of Sibiu County